Eldred Evans was a British architect. She and her partner David Shalev worked on more than 150 projects between 1964 and 2008, including Tate St Ives.

References 

2022 deaths
1937 births
20th-century British architects